Denys Granier-Deferre (born 27 December 1949, Boulogne-Billancourt) is a French film director.

Biography 
Denys Granier-Deferre is the son of Pierre Granier-Deferre with whom he started cinema as his assistant, notably on his father's movie Le Chat (1971). He then worked with different French directors before writing and filming his first movie, Que les gros salaires lèvent le doigt!, in 1982.

Filmography 
As director and writer
1982 : Que les gros salaires lèvent le doigt!
1984 : Réveillon chez Bob
2010 : Pièce montée

References

External links 

French film directors
1949 births
Living people